The Quantum Rose is a science fiction novel by Catherine Asaro which tells the story of Kamoj Argali and Skolian Prince Havyrl Valdoria. The book is set in her Saga of the Skolian Empire. It won the 2001 Nebula Award for Best Novel and the 2001 Affaire de Coeur Award for Best Science Fiction. The first third of the novel appeared as a three-part serialization in Analog magazine in the 1999 May, June and July/August issues.  Tor Books published the full novel in 2000.

Plot summary
The Quantum Rose is a retelling of the Beauty and the Beast folktale in a science fiction setting.  In the novel, Kamoj Argali, the governor of an impoverished province on the backward planet Balumil, is betrothed to Jax Ironbridge, ruler of a wealthy neighboring province, an arrangement made for political purposes to save her province from starvation and death. Havyrl (Vyrl) Lionstar, a prince of the titular Ruby Dynasty, comes to Balimul as part of a governmental plan to deal with the aftermath of an interstellar war.  Masked and enigmatic, he has a reputation as a monster with Kamoj's people.

Lionstar interferes with Kamoj's culture and destabilizes their government by pushing her into marriage with himself. In the traditional fairy tale, Belle must save her father from the prince transformed into a beast; in The Quantum Rose, Kamoj must save her province from the prince in exile.  The book deals with themes about the physical and emotional scars left on the survivors of a  war with no clear victor.  As such, it is also a story of healing for the characters Kamoj and Lionstar.

The second half of The Quantum Rose involves Lionstar's return to his home world with Kamoj, where he becomes the central figure in a planet wide act of civil disobedience designed to eject an occupying military force that has taken control of his planet.  Both the world Balimul in the first half of the novel and the world Lyshriol in the second half fall into the lost colony genre of literature in science fiction.

Context

The Quantum Rose is an allegory to the mathematical and physical processes of coupled-channel quantum scattering theory and as such is based on Asaro's doctoral work in chemical physics, with thesis advisor Alexander Dalgarno at the Harvard Smithsonian Center for Astrophysics.  Asaro describes the allegory in an essay at the end of the book and explains how the characters and plot points play the roles of mathematical terms or processes in atomic and molecular physics.  Each chapter of the book has a main poetic title, and then a subtitle which refers to the aspect of scattering theory highlighted in that chapter.  In an interview with The Hachiko, Asaro describes how she used the provocative nature of some scientific terminology to evoke conflicts dealt with in the book, such as the tensions between capture and freedom.  She discusses some of her inspiration for the book in "Moments of Genius," an interview at the Intel Big Think website.

This book overlaps with Spherical Harmonic, which tells the story of Ruby Pharaoh and her attempts to regain her title after the devastating Radiance War.

Reception
Locus reviewer Jennifer Hall received the novel favorably, saying "The writing is strong and the plot and characters engaging, and [Asaro] hold[s] it all together with a complexity of situations, scientific marvels, and loads of intrigue."

Jeri Wright, in a Featured Review for SF Site, gave a highly favorable review of the book, calling it "thought-provoking, entertaining, and very, very enjoyable", and commending Asaro for her "interesting scientific and cultural speculation".

References

2000 American novels
2000 science fiction novels
American science fiction novels
Novels about mathematics
Nebula Award for Best Novel-winning works
Saga of the Skolian Empire
Novels based on fairy tales
Novels by Catherine Asaro
Tor Books books
Works based on Beauty and the Beast